The Back to Basics Tour was the fourth concert tour and third world tour by American singer Christina Aguilera. The tour was launched to support her fifth studio album, Back to Basics (2006). It visited Europe, North America, Asia, and Australia from late 2006 to mid 2007. Though initially planned, four dates for New Zealand and Australia were cancelled due to Aguilera's pregnancy with her first child, Max Liron Bratman, born January 12, 2008. In October 2008, three extra dates to Ukraine and Abu Dhabi were added; therefore, the tour was Aguilera's first to visit the Middle East.

The concert was divided into four acts: 1920s, which displayed elements of R&B, funk, rock, and hip hop, Duke Joint, during which Aguilera performed in a red bodysuit, Circus, which employed the circus as the main theme, and the encore. The show in Abu Dhabi was shorter and did not include the encore due to its complexity with choreography and costume changes. The tour received positive reviews from music critics, some of whom were positive towards Aguilera's vocal performance and the show's background visuals, while some others approved the setlist, opining that the songs matched perfectly with each other.

The European leg of the Back to Basics Tour gained a large amount of commercial gross, with two sold-out shows in Dublin and Birmingham. The North American leg in 2007 grossed a total of US$30.6 million and sold 391,428 tickets. Overall, it became the highest-grossing concert tour by a female artist of the year, grossing US$48,287,793 and sold 907,568 tickets.. At the 2007 Billboard Touring Awards, the tour received two nominations for Breakthrough Act and Top Package. A video album, Back to Basics: Live and Down Under, which features the show at the Adelaide Entertainment Centre, was released in 2008.

Background
Aguilera's fifth studio album titled Back to Basics was released in August 2006. It was described by Aguilera herself as a record utilizing elements of 1920s-1940s jazz, soul, and blues "with a modern twist." The album debuted at number one on record charts of thirteen countries, including the US Billboard 200. Subsequently, Aguilera announced in September 2006 that she would embark on a worldwide concert tour named the Back to Basics Tour, which was described as an "intimate blues/jazz club tour", revealing the first European dates. The following month, dates for U.S. and Canada shows and that the Pussycat Dolls would be one of the opening acts for the U.S. leg was announced.

On July 31, 2007, a statement was released cancelling the last two shows from the tour, in Auckland, New Zealand, due to the singer's illness. Other two concerts in Melbourne had been previously canceled. She said:
"I would like to apologize once again to all of my fans here in New Zealand for having to cancel my last two shows of my tour. This is my first time in your beautiful country and I have really been looking forward to performing for you all. Unfortunately, I caught a bad flu virus and I have not been able to recover in time. Thank you all for your continued love and support and I can't wait for the next time.

Development
After releasing Back to Basics, Aguilera considered launching a tour of small clubs like the Blue Note in New York. "I think there is something really special about doing a performance like that and feeling the energy of a more intimate audience, and that is something we are definitely, definitely going to entertain in the future", she stated. However, Aguilera considered that it is "a more vulnerable approach for your performance. You can't hide behind anything. It's just you, and your audience is right in front of you, but I still love it. I love to perform more than anything else in the world, being on that stage and feeling the energy of the crowd enjoying your music". However, an arena tour would give her more time to work the bigger show and then strip it down to something raw and organic. Before the tour's launching, Aguilera stated that it was her my most inspired show to date. "[Expect] lots of amazing circus elements and throwback elements to the past and the areas that I am inspired by. It's just an interesting show to watch and to be a part of and to use your imagination", she said. Aguilera gave details of the concert, saying:
"[We are] trying to make it as big as possible... my band gets involved in some of the choreography. It's amazing that everybody sort of gets involved. We're all such teammates with each other when we're on that stage and we just all have such fun together.  And then we go into sort of a juke joint feel where we kind of you know, slash that with going to church [...]  And then we open it up to a circus element (scene), so there's a – so there's quite a journey that goes on, on stage for my audience and as a performer.  But it all does have a tie together, so it all kind of makes sense.  You really just got to come see the show, all right. It's so much fun to put on and we have a blast with it".
On the stage were at least 600 moving lights and 820 pounds of confetti. Jamie King was hired as the tour director. On her team there were at least 20 members, including her dancers, who "went into training. I'm so proud of them. "They learned how to stilt-walk, how to trapeze, fire-throw. There are so many different circus elements that are involved in the show, and it's just super fun". Aguilera also recruited Roberto Cavalli, who designed ten costumes. All the costumes have a vintage flare, referencing everything from 1940's-era Marlene Dietrich to 1960's bathing suits. He explained: "I am fascinated by the evolution of Christina's musical style, as well as her personal style, which has become increasingly glamorous and sophisticated with amazing attention to detail — all values I share in my design sensibility".

Concert synopsis
The show was divided into four sections: 1920s, Duke Joint, Circus and the encore, and lasted for 90 minutes. Performances in the 1920s section showcased elements of traditional rhythm and blues, funk, rock, and hip hop. Following a video introduction of "Intro (Back to Basics)", Aguilera appeared onstage and performed "Ain't No Other Man" with eight back-up dancers dressed in sharp white suits. Subsequently, she performed "Back in the Day" as images of classic jazz and soul artists including John Coltrane, Marvin Gaye, and Louis Armstrong appeared on the backdrop. Following that, she performed "Understand" in a mini-dress with long train, and a salsa version of "Come On Over Baby (All I Want Is You)", which featured a reggae beat. For the follow-up performance of "Slow Down Baby", Aguilera appeared in a white bodysuit; afterwards, she put on black lace thigh-highs and performed "Still Dirrty" featuring excerpts from "Can't Hold Us Down" as newspapers headlines such as "Christina goes from 'dirrty' to demure" and "Christina cleans up her act" were shown on screens.

The second act, Duke Joint, began with an erotic video interlude of "I Got Trouble", featuring scenes of Aguilera touching herself on bed and bathing in an old fashioned bathtub. For this section, Aguilera dressed in a sparkling red bodysuit. Aguilera performed "Makes Me Wanna Pray" on top of a piano, which was backed by a gospel choir. A remake of "What a Girl Wants" followed, featuring elements of reggae music. Duke Joint ended with Aguilera performing "Oh Mother" alone as images of a man repeatedly punching a woman as blood dripped from her face shown on the backdrop.

The third segment, Circus, opened with an interlude of "Enter the Circus" and a brief performance of "Welcome", which portrayed a circus-inspired stage as dancers swung on trapezes and breathed fire. For the performance of "Dirrty", which incorporated elements from "Cell Block Tango" from the Broadway musical Chicago and the classic march "Entrance of the Gladiators" by Julius Fučík, Aguilera rode a carousel horse. Next was the performance of "Candyman", in which Aguilera and the female dancers dressed in sailor styled suits and paid tribute to The Andrews Sisters, recreating a World War II theme. For the next number, "Nasty Naughty Boy", Aguilera expressed her S&M fantasy as she took a random male audience member onstage and attached him to the Wheel of Death. For the followup, "Hurt", Aguilera performed alone onstage in a plume outfit while a giant crescent moon descended from the ceiling. The section concluded with "Lady Marmalade", during which Aguilera performed in a pink embellished corset. The encore began with a video interlude of "Thank You (Dedication to Fans...)", featuring excerpts from Aguilera's previous music videos and voice mails from her fans. Aguilera then performed "Beautiful" alone onstage before ended the concert with "Fighter" with her dancers, at the end of which confetti rained down.

2008 Abu Dhabi setlist 
The 2008 setlist of the Back to Basics Tour in Abu Dhabi, UAE was slightly similar to the 2006-07 setlist, but was shorter and did not have the encore due to the show's complexity. The electropop version of "Genie in a Bottle", titled "Genie 2.0", was performed before the closing song "Fighter".

Critical response

The Back to Basics Tour received generally positive reviews from music critics. Jim Farber from the New York Daily News praised the show's accompaniment with a "horn-punctuated" band, the background visuals and the choreography, but called out Aguilera for her oversinging. An editor of the South China Morning Post, Paul Kay, provided a positive review toward the tour, applauding its synopsis and Aguilera's voice. Katie Boucher writing for the Abu Dhabi journal The National complimented the concert's setlist and Aguilera's attitude, writing that "you couldn't fail to be impressed by her spirit". Likewise, The Miami Students Nicole Smith opined that "she really does prove that she is a fighter, through domestic violence, deceit and the basic wear and tear of fame".

An editor from Manchester Evening News opined that the concert had "unusually-genuine message of empowerment" and compared its setlist to Britney Spears's The Onyx Hotel Tour (2004). In a journal for The Press of Atlantic City, Regina Schaffer noted the similarities between the show and Madonna's Confessions Tour (2006) and was not impressed towards the makeovers of Aguilera's previous singles, such as "Come On Over Baby (All I Want Is You)" and "What a Girl Wants". Writing for The New York Times, Kelefa Sanneh called the tour "disappointing" because of Aguilera's "misguided" voice. On a more positive side, Cameron Adams from the Herald Sun and Cathy Garcia from The Korea Times praised Aguilera's vocals on the Back to Basics Tour.

Barry Walters from Rolling Stone wrote that, "Whereas Madonna pioneered her brand of bustier feminism with knowing finesse, Aguilera and pals opt for strip-club bombast, even when belting pro-female anthems. Now more woman than girl, Aguilera's looking and sounding stronger than ever, but could benefit from a little adult nuance". Joey Guerra, on a review for the Houston Chronicle, praised Aguilera for being "no mere copycat" but "[taking] essential pieces from other performers, other sounds, other eras and blends them into her own sexy style", further concluding that the artist "claims her pop throne". Daily Trojans Michael Cooper labelled the tour "an almost-perfect pop concert" and commended on the show's "eye-catching" background and Aguilera's costumes.

Conversely, Sarah Godfrey from The Washington Post criticized the setlist and Aguilera's "overconfidence" during the show, but she noted that it was "insignificant" due to Aguilera's vocal performance. Dave Simpson of The Guardian gave the tour a two out of five stars rating, calling the song selection for the setlist "equally confusing" and opined that the tour was "delivered in a similar Mariah Carey tinnitus-inducing wail and the subject matter, generally, is that X-Tina is fantastic, is tough, is a victim and still enjoys sex – though hopefully not at the same time". Critic Kitty Empire from The Observer and Dave Tianen from the Milwaukee Journal Sentinel noted that the songs on the show did not go well with each other.

Commercial performance

After the United Kingdom leg, the Back to Basics Tour gained a huge number of tickets sold and revenue, with the tickets sold out in Dublin and Birmingham. Combined with the Belgium show, Billboard Boxscore calculated that the 9 shows garnered about $7.8 million. For the North America leg, although Billboard Boxscore did not calculate the attendance and gross for each date, the forty-one date run grossed a total of $28,921,000, with 391,700 tickets sold. After ten concerts held in Asia in early-July 2007, the Back to Basics Tour grossed $43,566,000, and became the second highest-grossing concert tour as of mid year 2007, only behind Justin Timberlake's FutureSex/LoveShow (with $52,187,000 grossed).

Aguilera initially planned a six date tour for the Australian leg. Subsequently, all of the tickets for the six dates had been sold out, leading Aguilera to expand the tour for three more dates in Perth, Brisbane and Adelaide. Four other dates for Melbourne and Auckland (New Zealand) were also planned, but was cancelled due to Aguilera suffering flu virus. The Back to Basics Tour garnered a total of $48.1 million in 2007, becoming the highest-grossing concert tour by a female of the year. At the 2007 Billboard Touring Awards, the Back to Basics Tour received two nominations: "Breakthrough Act" and "Top Package".

 Broadcasts and recordings 

The show filmed at the Adelaide Entertainment Centre in Adelaide, Australia on July 17 and 18, 2007, entitled Back to Basics: Live and Down Under, was aired on VH1 at 10 PM on January 26, 2008. RCA Records released the DVD for sales on February 4, 2008.

 Setlist 
The following set list was obtained from the concert held on November 30, 2006, at the Wembley Arena, in London, England. It does not represent all concerts from the duration of the tour.

 "(Back to Basics)" 
 "Ain't No Other Man"
 "Back in the Day"
 "Understand"
 "Come On Over Baby (All I Want Is You)" (jazz mix)
 "Slow Down Baby"
 "Still Dirrty" 
 "I Got Trouble" 
 "Makes Me Wanna Pray"
 "What a Girl Wants" (Reggae Mix)
 "Oh Mother"
 "Enter the Circus" 
 "Welcome"
 "Dirrty" 
 "Candyman"
 "Nasty Naughty Boy"
 "Hurt"
 "Lady Marmalade"Encore'

Shows

Cancelled shows

Personnel 
Tour Director – Jamie King
Musical Director – Rob Lewis
Choreographer – Jeri Slaughter
Costume Design – Roberto Cavalli
Shoes – Christian Louboutin
Tour Promoter – AEG Live
Tour Sponsors – Verizon Wireless, Orange, Sony Ericsson

Band
Guitar – Tariqh Akoni and Errol Cooney
Bass –  Ethan Farmer
Drums – Brian Frasier-Moore
Saxophone – Randy Ellis and Miguel Gandelman
Trumpet – Ray Monteiro
Trombone – Garrett Smith
Percussion – Ray Yslas
Background vocals – Sha'n Favors, Sasha Allen , Erika Jerry and Belle Johnson 
Dancers – Paul Kirkland, Kiki Ely, Tiana Brown, Dres Reid, Gilbert Saldivar, Monique Slaughter, Nikki Tuazon, Marcel Wilson and Jeri Slaughter

Crew
Stylist – Simone Harouche
Hair & Make-Up Designer – Steve Sollitto
Concert Video Design – Dago Gonzalez for Veneno, Inc.

See also 
 List of Christina Aguilera concerts
 List of Christina Aguilera concert tours

References

External links

 Aguilera's official website
 AEG official website

Christina Aguilera concert tours
2006 concert tours
2007 concert tours
2008 concert tours